Palutrus is a genus of gobies native to the Indian Ocean and the western Pacific Ocean.

Species
There are currently four recognized species in this genus:
 Palutrus meteori (Klausewitz & Zander, 1967) (Meteor goby)
 Palutrus pruinosa (D. S. Jordan & Seale, 1906) (Pruinosa goby)
 Palutrus reticularis J. L. B. Smith, 1959
 Palutrus scapulopunctatus (de Beaufort, 1912) (Scapular goby)

References

Gobiidae